Aalenirhynchia is an extinct subgenus of brachiopods found in Aalenian strata in Gloucestershire, England. It was a stationary epifaunal suspension feeder. Originally classed as a genus, it was reclassified as a subgenus of Rhynchonelloidea by Williams et al. in 2002.

References 

Animal subgenera
Prehistoric brachiopods
Rhynchonellida